Sceptre is an imprint of Hodder & Stoughton, a British publishing house which is a division of Hachette UK.

Founded in 1986 as the literary imprint of Hodder & Stoughton, Sceptre’s remit is to publish original fiction and non-fiction that aims not just to entertain and absorb but also to stretch the mind: to be thought-provoking, stimulating, surprising and enlightening.

Notable publications
David Mitchell
- Cloud Atlas (2004) - winner of the British Book Awards Literary Fiction Award, Richard & Judy Book of the Year Award, shortlisted for the 2004 Booker Prize, Nebula Award, and Arthur C. Clarke Award. Adapted into a film (2012) of the same name, starring Tom Hanks and Halle Berry.
- The Thousand Autumns of Jacob de Zoet (2010) - winner of the 2011 Commonwealth Writers' Prize regional prize, long-listed for the Booker Prize, shortlisted for the 2011 Walter Scott Prize.
Thomas Keneally
- Schindler's Ark (1982) - winner of the Booker Prize, adapted into the film Schindler's List, directed by Steven Spielberg
- The Widow and Her Hero (2007) - shortlisted for the Miles Franklin Award and for the Prime Minister's Literary Award
- The Daughters of Mars (2012)
Andrew Miller
- Ingenious Pain (1997)
- Oxygen (2001) - shortlisted for the Booker Prize and for the Whitbread Novel Award
- Pure (2011) - winner of the Costa Prize
 Chris Cleave
- The Other Hand (2008) - shortlisted for the 2008 Costa Book Award
- Gold (2012)
 Jenn Ashworth
 Siri Hustvedt
 Ned Beauman
- Boxer, Beetle (2010) - shortlisted for the Guardian First Book Award 2010

External links
 Sceptre
 Hodder & Stoughton

Cited sources

Book publishing companies of the United Kingdom
Publishing companies established in 1986
1986 establishments in the United Kingdom